The Plain of Catania (Sicilian: La Chiana di Catania, Italian: La Piana di Catania) is the most extensive and most important plain in Sicily.

Related categories
Province of Catania
Province of Enna

Catania
Landforms of Sicily
Province of Catania
Province of Enna
Province of Syracuse